Project Bakeover is a Canadian reality television series, which debuted on Food Network in 2021. Hosted by chocolatier Steve Hodge and designer Tiffany Pratt, the series features the duo helping struggling bakery businesses to transform their menu and decor.

The first season, consisting of ten episodes, ran as a split, with five episodes airing weekly beginning February 4, 2021, and five more episodes airing from May 27, 2021. A second season premiered in 2022.

The series received two Canadian Screen Award nominations at the 10th Canadian Screen Awards in 2022, for Best Direction in a Lifestyle or Information Program or Series (Naela Choudhary) and Best Editing in a Documentary Program or Series (Otto Chung).

Season 1

Episodes

Season 2

Episodes

References

External links

2021 Canadian television series debuts
2020s Canadian reality television series
Food Network (Canadian TV channel) original programming
Television series by Entertainment One